ESPN NFL PrimeTime 2002 is a sports video game developed and published by Konami for PlayStation 2 in 2001, and for Xbox and Windows in 2002.

Reception

The PlayStation 2 and Xbox versions received "mixed" reviews according to the review aggregation website Metacritic.

References

External links
 

2001 video games
ESPN NFL video games
Konami games
National Football League video games
North America-exclusive video games
PlayStation 2 games
Windows games
Xbox games
Video games developed in Japan